"The Adventures of Grandmaster Flash on the Wheels of Steel" is a single released by Grandmaster Flash in 1981. It is a live DJ mix recording of Flash scratching and mixing records from various groups using three turntables. This single was highly influential on many DJs, including rapper Dr. Dre, and an early example of what would eventually be termed turntablism.

Samples
Along with spoken word vocals from a 1966 album titled The Official Adventures of Flash Gordon, some of the primary records utilized to create the mix included: 
Chic – "Good Times"
Blondie – "Rapture"
Queen – "Another One Bites the Dust"
Sugarhill Gang – "8th Wonder"
The Furious Five – "Birthday Party"
Spoonie Gee – "Monster Jam"
Michael Viner's Incredible Bongo Band – "Apache"
Grandmaster Flash and the Furious Five – "Freedom"
Sugarhill Gang – "Rapper's Delight"
The Hellers – "Life Story"

Track listing

Vinyl
"The Adventures of Grandmaster Flash on the Wheels of Steel" - A-side
"The Birthday Party" (Instrumental) - B-side

CD
"The Adventures of Grandmaster Flash on the Wheels of Steel" .
"The Message"
"It's Nasty (Genius of Love)"

Reception
The song was ranked at #2 among the top ten "Tracks of the Year" for 1981 by NME.

Chart positions

References

External links
 Group's Official Website
 The Kidd Creole's Official Website

1981 singles
1981 songs
Songs written by Sylvia Robinson
Sugar Hill Records (Hip-Hop label) singles
Songs written by Melle Mel